Alan John Knight  (also rendered John Alan; also spelled Allan; 190429 November 1979) was a long serving Bishop of Guyana from 1937 until his death; and for much of that time Archbishop of the West Indies.

Background

He was educated at Owens School and Cambridge University and ordained in 1926. He was chaplain at University College School and then curate at St James’, Enfield Highway after which he was Headmaster of Adisadel College. In 1937 he was appointed to the episcopate; he was consecrated a bishop on St Peter's Day 1937 (29 June), by Cosmo Lang, Archbishop of Canterbury, at St Paul's Cathedral. A Sub-Prelate of the Order of St John of Jerusalem and prominent Freemason, he died in post on 29 November 1979, having become a Doctor of Divinity (DD).

References

People educated at Dame Alice Owen's School
Holders of a Lambeth degree
20th-century Anglican bishops in the Caribbean
Anglican bishops of Guyana
Anglican archbishops of the West Indies
20th-century Anglican archbishops
Companions of the Order of St Michael and St George
1904 births
1979 deaths
Alumni of the University of Cambridge
Sub-Prelates of the Venerable Order of Saint John
Alumni of Bishops' College, Cheshunt